The 2016 Mexican Open was a professional tennis tournament played on outdoor hard courts. It was the 23nd edition of the men's tournament (16th for the women), and part of the 2016 ATP World Tour and the 2016 WTA Tour. It took place in Acapulco, Mexico between 22 and 27 February 2016, at the Princess Mundo Imperial.

Points and prize money

Point distribution

Prize money 

1 Qualifiers prize money is also the Round of 32 prize money
* per team

ATP singles main-draw entrants

Seeds

1 Rankings as of February 15, 2016.

Other entrants
The following players received wildcards into the main draw:
  Lucas Gómez
  Tigre Hank
  Luis Patiño

The following player received entry using a protected ranking:
  Dmitry Tursunov

The following players received entry from the qualifying draw:
  Thiemo de Bakker
  Taylor Fritz
  Ryan Harrison
  Tommy Paul

Withdrawals
Before the tournament
  Kevin Anderson → replaced by  Dudi Sela
  Milos Raonic → replaced by  Dmitry Tursunov

Retirements
  Ivo Karlović (knee injury)

ATP doubles main-draw entrants

Seeds

1 Rankings as of February 15, 2016.

Other entrants
The following pairs received wildcards into the main draw:
  Jonathan Erlich /  Colin Fleming
  César Ramírez /  Miguel Ángel Reyes-Varela

The following pair received entry from the qualifying draw:
  Thiemo de Bakker /  Robin Haase

WTA singles main-draw entrants

Seeds

1 Rankings as of February 15, 2016.

Other entrants
The following players received wildcards into the main draw:
  Naomi Osaka
  Victoria Rodríguez
  Ana Sofía Sánchez

The following player received entry as a special exempt:
  Shelby Rogers

The following players received entry from the qualifying draw:
  Kiki Bertens
  Louisa Chirico
  Samantha Crawford
  Julia Glushko
  Urszula Radwańska
  Maria Sakkari

Withdrawals 
Before the tournament
  Alexandra Dulgheru → replaced by  Lourdes Domínguez Lino
  Madison Keys → replaced by  Anett Kontaveit
  Karin Knapp → replaced by  Lara Arruabarrena
  Magdaléna Rybáriková → replaced by  Monica Puig

During the tournament
  Victoria Azarenka (left wrist injury)

Retirements 
  Urszula Radwańska (left ankle injury)

WTA doubles main-draw entrants

Seeds

1 Rankings as of February 15, 2016.

Other entrants
The following pairs received wildcards into the main draw:
  Anastasia Pavlyuchenkova /  Yanina Wickmayer
  Victoria Rodríguez /  Renata Zarazúa

The following pair received entry as alternates:
  Julia Glushko /  Rebecca Peterson

Withdrawals
Before the tournament
  María-Teresa Torró-Flor (right rib injury)

Finals

Men's singles

  Dominic Thiem defeated  Bernard Tomic, 7–6(8–6), 4–6, 6–3

Women's singles

  Sloane Stephens defeated  Dominika Cibulková, 6–4, 4–6, 7–6(7–5)

Men's doubles

  Treat Huey /  Max Mirnyi defeated  Philipp Petzschner /  Alexander Peya, 7–6(7–5), 6–3

Women's doubles

  Anabel Medina Garrigues /  Arantxa Parra Santonja defeated  Kiki Bertens /  Johanna Larsson, 6–0, 6–4

References

External links